National Bureau of Investigation may refer to the following:
National Bureau of Investigation (Finland)
National Bureau of Investigation (Philippines)
National Bureau of Investigation (Slovenia)
National Bureau of Investigation (Sweden)
National Bureau of Investigation (Ukraine)
Central Bureau of Investigation (India)
Federal Bureau of Investigation (United States)
Police Bureau of Investigation (Bangladesh)
Rwanda Investigation Bureau
Central Investigation Bureau (Nepal)
Central Bureau of Investigation and Statistics (Republic of China (1912–1949))
Ministry of Justice Investigation Bureau (Taiwan)
Bureau of Investigation and Statistics (Republic of China (1912–1949))
Military Intelligence Bureau (Taiwan)
Criminal Investigation Agency (Indonesia)
Federal Investigation Agency (Pakistan)
National Investigation Agency (India)
Investigation Agency-ICTBD (Bangladesh)

See also
State bureau of investigation
Criminal investigation
Special Investigations Bureau (disambiguation)
Intelligence Bureau (disambiguation)
Criminal Investigation Department (disambiguation)
Accident Investigation Bureau (disambiguation)
Cambala Investigation Agency, Indian television show